John Mather D.D. was an English academic administrator at the University of Oxford.

Mather was elected President (head) of Corpus Christi College, Oxford in 1715, a post he held until 1748.
During his time as President of Corpus Christi, Mather was also Vice-Chancellor of Oxford University from 1723 until 1728.

References

Year of birth missing
Year of death missing
Presidents of Corpus Christi College, Oxford
Vice-Chancellors of the University of Oxford
18th-century English people